Pamela is a given name and, rarely, a surname.

Pamela may also refer to:

Arts, entertainment, and media

Music
Pamela Spence, a Turkish pop-rock singer, known by her stage name "Pamela"
"Pamela Pamela", a song recorded by Wayne Fontana that reached number 11 in the UK Singles Chart in 1967
"Pamela" (song), a 1988 hit song for the band Toto
"Pamella", a song by Remmy Ongala from the album Songs for the Poor Man
"Pamela Wan", a song composed by Vhong Navarro in 2004, inspired by the movie Otso-Otso Pamela-Mela-Wan

Other entertainment and media
Pamela (film), a 1945 French film
Pamela, A Love Story, an upcoming 2023 Netflix documentary about Pamela Anderson
Una donna da guardare, a 1990 Italian erotic movie
Pamela; or, Virtue Rewarded, a novel written by Samuel Richardson in 1740
P.A.M.E.L.A., a first-person survival video game

Other
MSC Pamela, a container ship launched in 2005
Pamela (butterfly), a butterfly genus
Perrhybris pamela, a butterfly with the common name Pamela
Pamela hat, a straw hat named after Richardson's heroine, worn 1790s–1870s
Super Typhoon Pamela, a typhoon in 1976

Acronyms
PAMELA Project, Process for Advanced Management of End of-Life-Aircraft
Payload for Antimatter Matter Exploration and Light-nuclei Astrophysics, astrophysical satellite module
Pedestrian Accessibility and Movement Environment Laboratory,  artificial pavement at a research center at University College London

See also
Pam (disambiguation)